Folgoso de la Ribera is a village and municipality located in the region of El Bierzo (province of León, Castile and León, Spain) . According to the 2010 census (INE), the municipality has a population of 1,233 inhabitants.

LINKS:

MOST COMPLETE WEB

Municipalities in El Bierzo
Populated places in the Province of León